Cecil Louisa Curle  (1901-12 April 1987) was a Scottish archaeologist and art historian.

Biography
Born Cecil Louisa Mowbray, she was first educated at home before studying history of art at the Glasgow College of Art, the Courtauld Institute, and the Sorbonne. Whilst in France she worked with to explore and paint some of the cave paintings at Lascaux.

After returning to Scotland Cecil became interested in Scottish archaeology. She was elected as a Fellow of the Society of Antiquaries of Scotland in 1934. She excavated at Ness of Burgi with A.O. Curle, as well as at Jarlshof and on Shetland. In 1936-1937 she was employed by the Office of Works to supervise excavations at the Brough of Birsay.

Cecil married Alexander T. Curle in 1938 - he was the son of the archaeologist A.O. Curle. During the Second World War they briefly moved to Dorset. As a result of her research on Early Christian Scotland, Curle (as she was now known) was elected as a Fellow of the Society of Antiquaries of London in 1943. In the 1970s and 1980s Curle published the find from her earlier excavations on the Brough of Birsay and followed this with the first volume in the Society of Antiquaries of Scotland Monograph series on a summary of the Pictish and Norse finds from the site.

Select publications
1936. "Excavation at the Ness of Burgi, Shetland", Proceedings of the Society of Antiquaries of Scotland, 60 (1935-6), 381–7. 
1940. "The chronology of the Early Christian monuments of Scotland", Proceedings of the Society of Antiquaries of Scotland, 74 (1939–40), 60–116. 
1962. "Some little known Early Christian  monuments in the West of Scotland", Proceedings of the Society of Antiquaries of Scotland, 95 (1961-2), 223–6.  
1974. "An engraved lead disc from the Brough at Birsay, Orkney", Proceedings of the Society of Antiquaries of Scotland, 105 (1972-4), 301–7. 
1982. "Pictish and Norse Finds from the Brough of Birsay 1934-74". (Society of Antiquaries of Scotland Monograph Series 1). Edinburgh. 
1983. "The finds from the Brough of Birsay 1934-1974", Orkney Heritage, 2 (1983), 67–81.

References

1901 births
1987 deaths
Fellows of the Society of Antiquaries of London
Fellows of the Society of Antiquaries of Scotland
Alumni of the Courtauld Institute of Art
British women archaeologists
Scottish archaeologists
Scottish art historians
Women art historians